Sandy Helberg (born May 28, 1949) is a German-born American actor.

Early life
Helberg was born in Frankfurt, Germany, the son of Tonia (née Altman) and Sam Helberg. His parents were both Holocaust survivors from German-occupied Poland, who met in a concentration camp. They emigrated to the United States in 1950, where his father, originally a barber, eventually became a real estate developer in Toledo, Ohio, where Sandy and his brothers Ted and Tom were raised.

Career
Helberg relocated to New York City and studied acting with Sanford Meisner at the Neighborhood Playhouse. He performed stand-up comedy and was part of an improv group that appeared in clubs in Greenwich Village. He later moved to Los Angeles, becoming an original member of the Los Angeles improv group, The Groundlings. Acting in several comedy films, in particular three Mel Brooks films High Anxiety, History of the World, Part I, and Spaceballs, he starred in the comedy films The Hollywood Knights and Up the Creek.

Helberg wrote and starred in the short-lived 1977 syndicated TV series The Lorenzo and Henrietta Music Show and the 1979 CBS TV series Flatbush. He has made numerous guest appearances on TV shows, including Trapper John, M.D., Remington Steele, Newhart, The Jeffersons,  M*A*S*H,  Married... with Children, The Wonder Years, Night Court, Fernwood 2 Night, Knight Rider, Too Close for Comfort, Get a Life, House Calls, Cybill, and Days of Our Lives among others.

Helberg co-starred in the NBC miniseries, 79 Park Avenue, and a CBS movie of the week, More Wild Wild West. He played Yeoman Purser Burl "Gopher" Smith in The Love Boat pilot; however, when it became an ABC television series, Fred Grandy took over the role.

Helberg and his wife Harriet wrote episodes for such television series as The Golden Girls, Perfect Strangers, Dear John, and Harry and the Hendersons. He also co-produced USO Salute to the Troops for HBO/TBS.

Personal life
Helberg has been married to Harriet Birnbaum, a casting director, since 1975 and has two sons, Mason and actor Simon.
Sandy and Harriet adopted their granddaughter, Lily Rose Helberg, at four months old. Lily was born May 12, 2016.

Filmography

References

External links

1949 births
Living people
20th-century American male actors
21st-century American male actors
American male film actors
American male television actors
German emigrants to the United States
20th-century German Jews
Jewish American male actors
Male actors from Toledo, Ohio
21st-century American Jews